Garrison of Sør-Varanger (GSV) is a military base of the Norwegian Army.  It is located at Høybuktmoen in Sør-Varanger Municipality in Troms og Finnmark county, Norway.  The military base sits adjacent to Kirkenes Airport, Høybuktmoen. The garrison is organized as a battalion and its main job is to guard the  Norway–Russia border. It consists of the Training Company (UTDKP), the Support Company (GAKP), the Jarfjord Company (JAR), the Pasvik company (PAS) and the Ranger Company (JGKP).

Service at GSV 
The troops stationed at GSV mainly consists of conscripted soldiers. Most of the soldiers are men, but there is also an increasing number of women represented. GSV receives about 400 new conscripts every six months.

The first seven weeks of recruit training, which is standard for all military personnel in Norway. After basic training, some of the soldiers are transferred to the garrison company to work in and around the garrison to support the education of the UTDKP, the GRKP itself and the mission-solvance of the GSV border company.

The rest of the soldiers stay in the education company to become border guards. After six months, through basic training, advanced training and specialist/designated training, the soldiers are divided up and sent to one of the six border stations.

The border service requires physical and mental stamina, discipline and the ability to think, decide and initiate. The service requires individuals and units to operate independently. The soldiers deployed for border service are basically trained as reconnaissance rangers. Most of the  time in the education company consist of field exercise, fire drills and role specialisation.

At the border, the soldiers are divided into four-person patrol teams. A typical patrol team consist of one patrol commander corporal, one communications technician, one medical specialist and one scout. Not assigned, but perfectly available for the teams are canine corporals, responsible for handling and training the patrol canines, and transportation corporals, responsible for mobility, administrative tasks and maintenance. In addition, a portion of the border guards are assigned with a dual role; reconnaissance and operations headquarters, they also serve as regular border guards.

The soldiers' main task is to function as border guards on the Russian border, guarding not only the border to a neighbouring country, but also the European border according to the Schengen Agreement.
The new Ranger Company (JGKP) have anti-mobility weapons as the Javelin missile system, they also deploy AT mines.

Border stations

Jarfjord
Pasvik

In addition to the border stations, some soldiers also staff the checkpoint at Storskog, the only legal crossing point between Norway and Russia. The checkpoint is also staffed by the Eastern Finnmark Police District, the Norwegian Customs and Excise Authorities, and the Norwegian Border Commission.

Treaty and sovereignty enforcement of the Norwegian border to Russia is a three-agency operation. The police district is responsible for prosecution, fines, and processing of illegal immigrants, asylum seekers, and border violations. The border commissioner is the policy-making and diplomatic department. It arranges contact and meetings with its Russian counterpart, makes agreements and rules, and is a substantial part of the diplomatic process. The garrison is responsible of military border patrol. The soldiers are granted police authority for border relations and is one of the few Norwegian law enforcement divisions carrying weapons and live ammunition on a daily basis.

References

External links

GSV official webpage
Norwegian border commissioner official webpage

Army units and formations of Norway
Border guards
Law enforcement in Norway
Military installations in Troms og Finnmark
Military units and formations established in 1921
Norway–Russia border
Sør-Varanger
1921 establishments in Norway